The 2015 United Football League Cup is the sixth edition of the United Football League Cup which started on May 2 and ended on August 28, 2015. This edition was supposed to be held in 2014 but the kick off was moved to 2015  with the main objective to eventually align league schedules with ASEAN neighbors.

Loyola Meralco Sparks are the defending champions.

The 20 teams which participated at the tournament were distributed into four groups for the group stage. All group stage matches will take place at the Rizal Memorial Stadium.

Kaya were crowned champions and qualified for a play-off spot at the 2016 AFC Cup.

Group stage
Tiebreakers
The teams are ranked according to points (3 points for a win, 1 point for a draw, 0 points for a loss). If tied on points, tiebreakers are applied in the following order:

Goal difference in all the group matches;
Greater number of goals scored in all the group matches;
If, after applying criteria 1 and 2, teams still have an equal ranking, criteria 1 and 2 are reapplied exclusively to the matches between the teams in question to determine their final rankings. If this procedure does not lead to a decision, criteria 4 to 8 apply;
Penalty shoot-out if only two teams are involved and they are both on the field of play;
Fewest red cards
Fewest yellow cards
Team who belongs to the member association with the higher AFC ranking.
Drawing of lots, coin toss or play-off match as determined by the Executive Committee

Group A

Philippine Army withdrew from the UFL Cup. Their matches against Green Archers United and Pasargad were designated as 0–3 defeats and 3 points were awarded to Philippine Army's remaining two oppositions.
Bright Star qualify as the result of Army's withdrawal, they also withdrew from the tournament without playing a single game at the round of 16 resulting UST to take its place.

Group B

Group C

Group D

Global was disqualified from the UFL Cup for fielding Satoshi Ōtomo as a Filipino player and ruled the club has violated the UFL's five-foreigner-rule. Matches of Global were originally decided to be forfeited after complaints from Ceres La-Salle FC, Kaya FC, Stallion FC, and Pachanga Diliman FC but the decision was overturn after the Appeals Committee ruled that the complainants did not follow proper procedure for reversing match outcomes. Last placers, Manila Nomads qualifies for the next round as a result.

Knock-out stage
The Knock-out stage is set to begin on August 13 and will end on August 28.

Round of 16

Quarterfinals

Semifinals

Third place playoff

Final

Awards

Source:

Statistics

Tournament team rankings

References

Cup
United Football League Cup seasons